Clitenella is a genus of skeletonizing leaf beetles in the family Chrysomelidae. There are five described species in Clitenella, found in Indomalaya and the Palearctic.

Species
These five species belong to the genus Clitenella:
 Clitenella fulminans (Faldermann, 1835)
 Clitenella ignitincta (Fairmaire, 1878)
 Clitenella punctata Laboissiere, 1927 (synonym:  Clitenella yunnana (Yang & Li, 1997))
 Clitenella purpureovittata (Chen, 1942)
 Clitenella unicolor Samoderzhenkov, 1988 (synonym: Clitenella sukarnoi Mohamedsaid, 2001)

References

Galerucinae
Chrysomelidae genera